Orlando: A Biography is a novel by Virginia Woolf, first published on 11 October 1928. Inspired by the tumultuous family history of the aristocratic poet and novelist Vita Sackville-West, Woolf's lover and close friend, it is arguably one of her most popular novels; Orlando is a history of English literature in satiric form. The book describes the adventures of a poet who changes sex from man to woman and lives for centuries, meeting the key figures of English literary history. Considered a feminist classic, the book has been written about extensively by scholars of women's writing and gender and transgender studies.

The novel has been adapted a number of times. In 1989, director Robert Wilson and writer Darryl Pinckney collaborated on a single-actor theatrical production. This had its British premiere at the Edinburgh Festival in 1996, with Miranda Richardson playing the title role; Isabelle Huppert performed in the version in French, which opened at the Théâtre Vidy-Lausanne in Lausanne (Switzerland) in 1993. A film adaptation by Sally Potter, simply titled Orlando, was released in 1992, starring Tilda Swinton in the title role. A stage adaption by Sarah Ruhl premiered in New York City in 2010, with another version premiering at the Garrick Theatre, London in 2022 starring Emma Corrin and directed by Michael Grandage. The novel has also been adapted into operatic works.

Plot 
The eponymous hero is born as a male nobleman in England during the reign of Elizabeth I. He undergoes a mysterious change of sex at the age of about 30 and lives on for more than 300 years into modern times without ageing perceptibly.

As a teenage boy, the handsome Orlando serves as a page at the Elizabethan court and becomes the "favourite" of the elderly queen. After Elizabeth's death, he falls deeply in love with Sasha, an elusive and somewhat feral princess in the entourage of the Russian embassy. This episode, of love and ice skating against the background of the celebrated Frost Fair held on the frozen Thames River during the Great Frost of 1608, when "birds froze in mid air and fell like stones to the ground", inspired some of Virginia Woolf's most bravura writing:Great statesmen, in their beards and ruffs, despatched affairs of state under the crimson awning of the Royal Pagoda ... Frozen roses fell in showers when the Queen and her ladies walked abroad ... Near London Bridge, where the river had frozen to a depth of some twenty fathoms, a wrecked wherry boat was plainly visible, lying on the bed of the river where it had sunk last autumn, overladen with apples. The old bumboat woman, who was carrying her fruit to market on the Surrey side, sat there in her plaids and farthingales with her lap full of apples, for all the world as if she were about to serve a customer, though a certain blueness about the lips hinted the truth.
The melting of the ice coincides with Sasha's unfaithfulness and sudden departure for Russia. The desolate Orlando returns to writing The Oak Tree, a long poem started and abandoned in his youth. He meets and hospitably entertains an invidious poetaster, Nicholas Greene, who proceeds to find fault with Orlando's writing. Later Orlando feels betrayed on learning that he has been lampooned in one of Greene's subsequent works. A period of contemplating love and life leads Orlando to appreciate the value of his ancestral stately home, which he proceeds to furnish lavishly. There he plays host to the populace.

Ennui sets in and Orlando feels harassed by a persistent suitor, the tall and somewhat androgynous Archduchess Harriet, leading Orlando to look for a way to leave the country. He is appointed by King Charles II as ambassador to Constantinople. Orlando performs his duties well, until a night of civil unrest and murderous riots. He falls asleep for a period of days, and others cannot rouse him. Orlando awakens to find that he has metamorphosed into a woman – the same person, with the same personality and intellect, but in a woman's body. Although the narrator of the novel professes to be disturbed and befuddled by Orlando's change, the fictional Orlando complacently accepts the change. From here on, Orlando's amorous inclinations change frequently, although she stays biologically female.

The now Lady Orlando covertly escapes Constantinople in the company of a Romani clan. She adopts their way of life until its essential conflict with her upbringing leads her to head home. Only on the ship back to England, with her constraining female clothes and an incident in which a flash of her ankle nearly results in a sailor's falling to his death, does she realise the magnitude of becoming a woman. She concludes it has an overall advantage, declaring "Praise God I'm a woman!" Back in England, Orlando is hounded again by the archduchess, who now reveals herself to be a man, the Archduke Harry. Orlando evades his marriage proposals. She goes on to switch gender roles, dressing alternately as a man and woman.

Orlando engages energetically with life in the 18th and 19th centuries, holding court with great poets, notably Alexander Pope. Critic Nick Greene, apparently also timeless, reappears and promotes Orlando's writing, promising to help her publish The Oak Tree.

Orlando wins a lawsuit over her property and marries a sea captain, Marmaduke Bonthrop Shelmerdine. Like Orlando, he is gender non-conforming, and Orlando attributes the success of their marriage to this similarity. In 1928, she publishes The Oak Tree, centuries after starting it, and wins a prize. In the novel's ending, Orlando's husband flies over the mansion in an aeroplane, which hovers above Orlando until Shelmerdine leaps to the ground. A stray bird flies over his head and Orlando exults, "It's the goose! The wild goose!"  The novel ends on the final stroke of midnight on Thursday, Oct. 11, 1928 (the day the novel would be published).

Inspiration 
Woolf and Vita Sackville-West were both members of the Bloomsbury Group, which was known for its liberal views on sexuality. The two began a sexual and romantic relationship that lasted for a decade, and continued as a friendship long after that. Notably, this inspiration is confirmed by Woolf herself, who noted in her diary the idea of Orlando on 5 October 1927: "And instantly the usual exciting devices enter my mind: a biography beginning in the year 1500 and continuing to the present day, called Orlando: Vita; only with a change about from one sex to the other".

Nigel Nicolson, Sackville-West's son, wrote, "The effect of Vita on Virginia is all contained in Orlando, the longest and most charming love letter in literature, in which she explores Vita, weaves her in and out of the centuries, tosses her from one sex to the other, plays with her, dresses her in furs, lace and emeralds, teases her, flirts with her, drops a veil of mist around her."

Analysis 

In the novel, Woolf satirizes Sackville-West's fascination with the Romany people, as it is the Romany caravan in the Balkans that first accepts Orlando as a woman. It is also hinted that it was a spell cast by the Romany witch whom Orlando married that caused Orlando's transformation. The Romany witch, Rosita Pepita, shares the name of Sackville-West's grandmother, a Spanish dancer. 

Orlando remains an English aristocrat regardless of her sex, and cannot really adjust to the nomadic lifestyle of the Romany caravan as it wanders across the Balkans and Anatolia. In real life, Sackville-West fantasized about joining a Romany caravan, but she did not really wish to give up the settled life of the aristocracy for living in poverty, or to be subject to the same discrimination that the Romany were. 

Woolf also satirizes British culture in the sense that "inversion" (as lesbianism was then called) was allowed as long as it was presented as a fantastical allegory that was only real in the sense that the book was about Sackville-West, but could not be realistic. Woolf also intended the novel as compensation for the sense of loss often felt by Sackville-West who lost her beloved childhood home Knole which went to a cousin and which she would have inherited if she had been a man; about her need to hide her sexuality and about the unhappy end of her relationship with Violet Trefusis in 1920. Sackville-West in a letter praised Woolf for compensation for her sense of loss, saying: "I am in no fit state to write to you...I only tell you that I am really shaken, which may seem to you silly and useless, but which is really a greater tribute than pages of calm appreciation...Darling, I don't know and scarcely even like to write how overwhelmed am I, how could you hung so splendid a garment on so poor a peg...Also, you have invented a new form of narcissism-I confess-I am in love with Orlando-this is a complication I had not foreseen". In the book, Orlando as a woman wins control of her family estate, which bears a close resemblance to Knole, which addressed Sackville-West's sense of loss about losing the estate that she had grown up in and deeply loved only because she was a woman. Likewise, Trefusis appears in the novel as the Russian princess Sasha, whom Orlando sincerely loves, but the responsibility for the failure of the relationship rests entirely with her, whereas in real life Sackville-West knew that the story she used as a reason for terminating her relationship with Trefusis, namely she had slept with her husband Major Dennys Trefusis was almost certainly false. The picture of Sackville-West that Woolf presented as her alter-ego Orlando was not completely positive, as Woolf felt only contempt for Sackville-West's literary abilities, regarding her as a mediocre writer as she wrote to her husband Leonard Woolf "she writes with a pen of brass". The recurring image of the grey goose that Orlando chases after, but never captures over the centuries is an allegory for the ability to write a truly great novel that Sackville-West longed to do, but never managed. Perhaps fortunately for herself, a bewildered Sackville-West never understood what the goose was a symbol of, writing to her husband Harold Nicolson: "What does the goose stand for? Fame? Love? Death? Marriage?". For Woolf herself, the book was compensation for a sense of loss. Woolf was often hurt by Sackville-West's promiscuity and unfaithfulness, and Orlando allowed her to have a more idealised version of Sackville-West that would belong to her forever.

The American scholar Victoria Smith argued the book is about the impossibility of representing the female experience in its entirety as a recurring theme of the book is Orlando's inability to properly describe emotions, people and even such banal occurrences as a sunset. Throughout the book, Orlando cannot describe Sasha or nature, the biographer cannot properly write up a description of Orlando, and the love which Orlando feels for Shelmerdine is referred to as undefinable. When Orlando attempts to define love, he says to himself: "Every single thing, once he tried to dislodge it from his place in his mind, he thus cumbered with other matter like a lump of grass, which after a year at the bottom of the sea, is grown about with bones and dragon-flies, and the tresses of women's hair". Likewise, when Orlando attempts to simply say the grass is green and the sky is blue, he instead finds himself thinking "...the sky is like the veils over which a thousand Madonnas have their hair fall; and the grass fleets and darkens like a flight of girls fleeing hairy satyrs for the woods". Smith maintained whenever Orlando's attempt to say that the sky is blue and the grass is green, instead brings images of women, nature, classical mythology and religion into his mind, thus highlighting Woolf's viewpoint "...that the "natural"-the grass, the sky-already are encumbered with myths of and representations of women and their sexuality. Finally, the passage ends with precisely the conundrum of language that Woolf highlights: that even through the images used to convey the objects are "false", the object are nonetheless conveyed." Smith argued that this rhetorical ambiguity that Woolf used was a commentary on "the love that dared not speak its name" as the book was meant to celebrate her love for Sackville-West while at the same time disguising it even though the two women were immune from being prosecuted by the authorities (male homosexuality, but not lesbianism, was illegal in Britain until 1967). Woolf intended the book to be therapeutic, to address the sense of loss felt by Sackville-West as well as herself, to provide a "spark" of hope to keep herself from drowning in what she called in her diary "a great sea of melancholy".

Woolf was often critical of British historiography, which at the time was largely concerned with political-military history, which she accused of neglecting the lives of women, which with the exceptions of leaders like Elizabeth I, Anne, and Victoria, were almost totally ignored. The novel takes place over several ages of British history, namely the Renaissance, the Restoration, the Enlightenment, the Romantic, the Victorian and the present, and Woolf uses the various ages to mock theories of history. Orlando's biographer says that her style of poetry becomes less florid as the 17th century went on, which he suggests was because the streets were cleaner and the dishes less showy. Woolf's father, the historian Sir Leslie Stephen, whom she both loved and hated at the same time, had proposed in his book English Literature and Society in the Eighteenth Century, a theory that what writers choose to write about reflects contemporary tastes, a "return to nature" as "literature must be produced by the class which embodies the really vital and powerful currents of thought which molds society". That Orlando's biographer believes that it was changes in British cuisine and the condition of the countryside that had changed Orlando's style of writing is a reductio ad absurdum of Stephen's theories. Stephen identified various writers, all of them men, as the "key" figures of an age, whereas his daughter wanted historians to pay attention to women writers that they usually ignored, and the unflattering picture of Pope that Woolf presents is a caricature of her father's theories (Stephen had identified Pope as the "key" writer of early Georgian England). Likewise, when Orlando was a man, he had no hesitations about showing off his manuscript for The Oak Tree, but as a woman, she constantly hides it when visitors come, as Jane Austen was alleged to do with the manuscripts for her books, which was Woolf's way of satirizing the different behaviour expected of male and female writers. Stephen believed that great writers must work in "the spirit of the age", which led him in his book Hours in the Library to praise Sir Walter Scott as representing the "spirit" of the Romantic age while Charlotte Brontë was dismissed as a writer because she was out of touch with the "spirit" of the Victorian age. Woolf satirizes her father's theories as in during the Victorian Age that Orlando marries, changes drastically the quality of her writings, and the very idea of being pregnant makes her ashamed, which so sharply differs from the way that the character had been portrayed before as to imply these changes in her personality are forced as she struggles to conform to the "spirit" of the Victorian era.

At the same time, Woolf, though she was critical of many aspects of British life, felt a deep sense of affinity in her country, where the past seemed to live on in so many ways. Woolf was inspired to write Orlando when Sackville-West took her to Knole, to show her the place where she had grown up, that had belonged to the Sackville family for centuries, and as Sackville-West bitterly noted she would have inherited if only she had been born male. During the course of their visit, a farmer came in with a wagon full of wood to be chopped up to heat Knole, which Sackville-West said had been done for hundreds of years, which gave Woolf the idea of the English past was not dead, but still alive, a theme that is expressed in Orlando by the ageless, timeless nature of the eponymous character. That the 19th century begins with a heavy thunderstorm, and throughout the scenes set in the Victorian age it always seems to be raining, reflected Woolf's view of the Victorian era has a dark one in British history, as it was only with the Edwardian era that sunshine returns to Orlando. As part of her attack on Victorian values, Woolf satirized the theories of the influential critic John Ruskin who saw the Renaissance as a period of moral and cultural decline, which he called a "frost". On the contrary, Woolf depicted the parts of the book set in the Elizabethan-Jacobean era as one of rebirth and vitality, of a time when "the moon and stars blazed with the hard fixity of diamonds". It is during this period that Orlando first falls in love with the Russian princess Sasha, which leads to "the ice turned to wine in his veins, he heard the water flowing and the birds singing". As a criticism of Ruskin, it was during the Great Frost of 1608 that Orlando first discovers his sexuality with Sasha, turning Ruskin's frost metaphor for the Renaissance on its head.

That it was in Constantinople that Orlando become a woman reflects the city's status in the 17th century as a melting pot of cultures with a mixed population of Turks, Greeks, Armenians, Sephardic Jews, Circassians, Sudanese, and other peoples from all over the Ottoman Empire, in short a place with no fixed identity that existed half in Europe and half in Asia, making the city the perfect backdrop for Orlando's transformation. Furthermore, Constantinople had been founded by the Greeks as Byzantium in 7th century BC; had become the capital of the Roman empire in 324 AD when the Emperor Constantine the Great renamed the city after himself; for centuries had been seen as a bastion of Christianity against Islam; was taken by the Ottomans in a siege in 1453, becoming the capital of the world's most powerful Muslim empire; and was renamed Istanbul in 1924, making the city itself into a metaphor for shifting identities, whatever they be national, cultural, religious, gender, ethnic or sexual. In the 17th century, Constantinople was Europe's largest city as well as one of the wealthiest. The American scholar Urmila Seshagiri wrote that the "fixed British hegemonies" of the early chapters set in London and in the English countryside seem "fragile" when Orlando is confronted with the vast, teeming, wealthy city of Constantinople with its multi-ethnic, multi-religious population that appears as a far more powerful and greater city than London, which was Woolf's way of undermining the assumption widely held in 1928 Britain that the British Empire was the world's greatest empire. Sackville-West had lived in Constantinople in 1912-14 when Nicolson had been the Third Secretary at the British embassy and loved that city, which she viewed as a beautiful city full of diverse cultures and peoples. That Orlando's transformation occurs during the course of anti-Christian riots by the Muslim population of Constantinople is Woolf's attack on British imperialism. By the second half of the 17th century, the Ottoman Empire was in decline while the British empire was on the ascent, which is the precise time that Orlando changes sex. Woolf believed that the "Eastern Question" as imperial rivalry for control of Constantinople, "the city of all the world's desire" as it sits at a strategic location where Europe and Asia meet to have been one of the main causes of the First World War, and by dating Orlando's transformation at the moment that the Ottoman Empire began to decline was a political point. One of the main justifications for the British empire was the alleged need to protect white women from being raped by non-white men, and by having Lady Orlando escape from Constantinople without a man to protect her was an attack upon this theory.

Influence and recognition 
Orlando was a contemporary success, both critically and financially, and guaranteed the Woolfs' financial stability. It was generally viewed not just as high literature, but as a gossipy novel about Sackville-West. However, the New York Times review of the book acknowledged the importance of the work as an experiment into new forms of literature.

The work has been the subject of numerous scholarly writings, including detailed treatment in multiple works on Virginia Woolf. An "annotated" edition has been published to facilitate critical reading of the text.

The novel's title has also come to stand in some senses for women's writing generally, as one of the most famous works by a woman author that directly treats the subject of gender. For example, a project at the University of Cambridge on the history of women's writing in the British Isles was named after the book.

A literary critique of Orlando on an onomastic and psychological basis was conducted by the historian and Italianist Alessio Bologna in his book: 
Alessio Bologna, L'Orlando ariostesco in Virginia Woolf, in Id., Studi di letteratura "popolare" e onomastica tra Quattro e Cinquecento, Pisa, ETS 2007, pp. 75-85 ("Nominatio. Collana di Studi Onomastici").

The skating party on the Thames was featured in Simple Gifts, a Christmas collection of six animated shorts shown on PBS in 1977.

The 1981 film Freak Orlando, by German artist, writer, and director Ulrike Ottinger, is an adaptation of the story, blending it with aspects of Tod Browning's 1931 seminal scifi/ horror film, Freaks.

The novel has been adapted for theatre and film. In 1989 the American director Robert Wilson, and writer Darryl Pinckney collaborated on a theatrical production. A British film adaptation was released in 1992, starring Tilda Swinton as Orlando and Quentin Crisp as Queen Elizabeth I.

A second theatre adaptation of Orlando, by Sarah Ruhl, was first presented by the Piven Theatre Workshop in Evanston, Illinois in 1998. It was presented by The Actors' Gang Theater in Los Angeles in 2003. The play premiered Off-Broadway in New York in 2010. It subsequently premiered for the Sydney Theatre Company in Australia at the Sydney Opera House starring Jacqueline McKenzie in the title role.

In 2016, composer Peter Aderhold and librettist Sharon L. Joyce premiered an opera based on the work at the Braunschweig State Theater, as well as an opera by Olga Neuwirth, premiered in the Vienna State Opera in December 2019.

The League of Extraordinary Gentlemen comics feature Orlando, starting with a mention in The New Traveller's Almanac and short story and cameo in Black Dossier. Orlando is then featured as a main character in Volume III: Century and Volume IV: The Tempest.

On November 5, 2019, the BBC News listed Orlando on its list of the 100 most influential novels.

In November 2022, a new theatre adaptation by Neil Bartlett, directed by Michael Grandage, and starring Emma Corrin opened at the Garrick Theatre in London's West End.

Notes

References

External links 

 
 
 Virginia Woolf's Orlando by Ted Gioia (Conceptual Fiction)

1928 British novels
British alternative history novels
Bloomsbury Group in LGBT history
Cultural depictions of Elizabeth I
Hogarth Press books
Modernist novels
Novels by Virginia Woolf
Metafictional novels
Roman à clef novels
British novels adapted into films
British novels adapted into plays
British science fiction novels
Novels with bisexual themes
Feminist novels
Novels adapted into operas
Novels with transgender themes